This is a list of albums released under YG Entertainment.

1990s

1996
 Keep Six – Six in tha Chamber

1997
 Jinusean – Jinusean

1998
 Jinusean – The Real
 YG – Yang Hyun Suk
 1TYM – One Time For Your Mind

1999
 Jinusean – 2nd Shot
 YG Family – Famillenium
 YG Family – Y.G. Best of Album

2000s

2000
 1TYM – 2nd Round

2001
 Jinusean – The Reign
 Perry – Perry by Storm
 1TYM – Third Time Fo' Yo' Mind

2002
 Swi.T – Song Will Tell
 Wheesung – Like a Movie
 YG Family – Why Be Normal?

2003
 Gummy – Like Them
 Big Mama – Like the Bible
 SE7EN – Just Listen
 Masta Wu – Masta Peace
 Stony Skunk – 1st Best Seller
 Wheesung – It's Real
 Lexy – Lexury
 1TYM – Once N 4 All
 YG Family – Color of the Soul Train Live Concert

2004
 XO – Extra Ordinary 
 Wanted – Like the First
 Taebin – Taebin of 1TYM
 SE7EN – Must Listen
 Gummy – It's Different
 Wheesung – For the Moment
 Jinusean – Norabosae

2005
 45RPM – Old Rookie
 Big Mama – It's Unique
 Soulstar – Soulstar
 Stony Skunk – Ragga Muffin
 Lexy – Lextacy
 Gummy – For the Bloom
 Wheesung – Love... Love...? Love...!
 Big Mama – Gift
 1TYM – One Way

2006
 SE7EN – Must Listen (China)
 SE7EN – 24/7
 SE7EN – First SE7EN
 Gummy – Unplugged
 SE7EN – 24/7 (Repackage)
 Stony Skunk – Skunk Riddum
 Big Mama – For the People
 YG Family – YG 10th
 SE7EN – Se7olution
 Big Bang – Big Bang Vol. 1

2007

2008

2009

2010s

2010

2011

2012

2013

2014

2015

2016

2017

1 Released through independent sub-label The Black Label.
3 Released through independent sub-label HIGHGRND.
4 Special project group.

2018

1 Released through independent sub-label The Black Label.

2019

1 Released through independent sub-label The Black Label.
2 Released through independent sub-label YGX Entertainment.

2020s

2020

1 Released through independent sub-label The Black Label.
2 Released through independent sub-label YGX Entertainment.

2021

1 Released through independent sub-label Fire Exit Records.
2 Released through independent sub-label The Black Label.

2022

References

 

Discographies of South Korean record labels
Pop music discographies
Discography